Stenalia dolini is a beetle in the genus Stenalia of the family Mordellidae. It was described in 1974 by Lazorko.

References

dolini
Beetles described in 1974